Qebleh Ei may refer to:
 Qebleh Ei Do
 Qebleh Ei Pain